Alpağut is a village in the Ağın District of Elazığ Province in Turkey. Its population is 245 (2021). The village is populated by Kurds.

References

Villages in Elazığ District
Kurdish settlements in Elazığ Province